is a passenger railway station located in the city of Kinokawa, Wakayama Prefecture, Japan, operated by the West Japan Railway Company (JR West).

Lines
Kii-Nagata Station is served by the Wakayama Line, and is located 67.2 kilometers from the terminus of the line at Ōji Station.

Station layout
The station consists of one side platform serving a single bi-directional track. There is no station building, but only a weather shelter on the platform. The station is unattended.

Adjacent stations

|-

History
The line was sold to the Kansai Railway in 1904, which was subsequently nationalized in 1907. It became a full station on July 15, 1938, but was closed from August 10, 1941 to September 23, 1952. With the privatization of the Japan National Railways (JNR) on April 1, 1987, the station came under the aegis of the West Japan Railway Company.

Passenger statistics
In fiscal 2019, the station was used by an average of 100 passengers daily (boarding passengers only).

Surrounding Area
Kannon-ji (Nagata Kannon)

See also
List of railway stations in Japan

References

External links

 Kii-Nagata Station Official Site

Railway stations in Wakayama Prefecture
Railway stations in Japan opened in 1903
Kinokawa, Wakayama